Television in Albania was first introduced in 1960. RTSH dominated the Albanian broadcasting field up to the mid-1990s, a period when privately owned radio and TV stations started to occupy the vast empty Albanian frequencies.

After several years of being stalled, deadlines for transition to DTV broadcasting are being continuously announced until all subscribers are equipped with digital antennas.

Albania has 3 national commercial television stations, 56 local stations, 83 local cable stations and two commercial multiplexes.

Of all the existing national television stations, the public broadcaster Radio Televizioni Shqiptar (RTSH) has the greatest reach: its signal covers 80.5% of the territory, followed by Top Channel with 79%, and TV Klan with 78%. However, there are also digital multiplexes but they are unaccounted for in the territorial reach figures.

It could be said that the other main TV stations, based in Tirana, whose signal covers a significant part of the territory include: Ora News, Ora Tv, News 24, Dritare Tv, Channel One, Vizion Plus, IN TV, BBF TV, Report TV and Radio Televizioni SCAN. Apart from the latter stations, most others are round-the-clock news channels.

Digital broadcasting is available mainly in Tirana and Durrës, though it is gradually being introduced to the western lowland and further inland.

Below is a list of television stations and TV providers broadcasting in the Republic of Albania:

Most viewed channels

See also 
 Media of Albania
 Sports broadcasting contracts in Albania
 Television in Italy
 Top Channel
  Tv Klan
  Vizion Plus
  DigitAlb
   Tring Platform
 RTSH Digital

References

Further reading
TV Ownership in Albania - Media Ownership Monitor Albania
Londo, Ilda. Television across Europe: follow-up reports 2008 - Albania. Budapest: Open Society Institute, 2008
 Londo, Ilda. Media Ownership, Independence, and Pluralism. Tirana: Albanian Media Institute, 2007
 Londo, Ilda. Digital television in Albania: Policies, development and public debate. Tirana: Albanian Media Institute, 2006
 Kalaja, Diana. Menaxhimi i mediave televizive shqiptare gjate kalimit nga transmetimi analog ne dixhital. Tirana: University of Tirana, 2016 (Albanian)
 (Albanian)

External links 
  AMA - Authority of Audiovisual Media
 Albanian Media Institute
 Telemetrix Albania Rating and Share Agency
 Abacus Research Rating and Share Agency

 
Television stations